Senator Bartlett may refer to:

Members of the United States Senate
Bob Bartlett (1904–1968), U.S. Senator from Alaska from 1959 to 1968
Dewey F. Bartlett (1919–1979), U.S. Senator from Oklahoma from 1973 to 1979

United States state senate members
Bailey Bartlett (1750–1830), Massachusetts State Senate
Charles H. Bartlett (1833–1900), New Hampshire State Senate
Charles Lafayette Bartlett (1853–1938), Georgia State Senate
Ichabod Bartlett (1786–1853), New Hampshire
Josiah Bartlett Jr. (1768–1838), New Hampshire State Senate
M. D. Bartlett, Wisconsin State Senate
Martin F. Bartlett, Maine State Senate
Oscar Bartlett (1823–1911), Wisconsin State Senate 
Phil Bartlett (born 1976), Maine State Senate
Susan Bartlett (born 1946), Vermont State Senate
Thomas Bartlett Jr. (1808–1876), Vermont State Senate
Washington Bartlett (1824–1887), California State Senate
William S. Bartlett Jr., New Hampshire State Senate

Others
Andrew Bartlett (born 1964), Senate of Australia
Manuel Bartlett (born 1936), Senate of Mexico